Christina Hennings ( Gerking, born 21 January 1984 in Leer) is a German rower. She won silver at the 2006 World Rowing Championships in Eton, Berkshire. She competed at the 2008 Summer Olympics with the women's eight; the team came seventh.

On 25 March 2008, she married Kai Hennings at Hanover and has since been known as Christina Hennings.

References 

 

1984 births
Living people
German female rowers
People from Leer
Sportspeople from Lower Saxony
Rowers at the 2008 Summer Olympics
Olympic rowers of Germany
World Rowing Championships medalists for Germany
20th-century German women
21st-century German women